The Romanov Family Association is an organization for descendants of the former Russian Imperial House.  It was created in 1979 and officially registered in Switzerland.  The current head of the organization is Princess Olga Andreevna.

History
The idea for the creation of a family association was thought up by Prince Vsevolod Ioannovich, Prince Roman Petrovich and Prince Andrei Alexandrovich the heads of the Konstantinovichi, Nikolaevichi and Mihailovichi branches of the Imperial Family in order to strengthen the links between the family and protect it from impostors. Following the death of Prince Roman Petrovich in 1978, his son Prince Nicholas Romanovich, after looking through his father's papers found that everything was effectively in place for the creation of a family association. Prince Nicholas then wrote to all the Romanovs who had been in communication with his father and it was agreed that a Family Association should be created. In 1979 the Romanov Family Association was officially formed with Prince Dmitri Alexandrovich as president and Prince Nicholas Romanovich as vice president. Prince Nicholas Romanovich was elected president, following Prince Vasili Alexandrovich who died in 1989.

The association accepts that since 3 March (Julian Calendar) / 16 March (Gregorian Calendar), 1917 with the decree of Grand Duke Michael Alexandrovich of Russia's deferral of acceptance of the throne, that the Russian Provisional Government was recognized. Article IV-b of the bylaws of the Romanov Family Association states "The Members of the Association agree that all questions concerning the form of government in Russia and consequently also all matters of a dynastic character have been transmitted to the will of the great Russian people by the Manifest of Grand Duke Michael Alexandrovich, which followed the abdication of Emperor Nicholas II on the basis of 'general, direct, equal and secret voting'."

As a charitable endeavor, the association operates the Romanov Fund for Russia to raise money for aid projects in Russia.

Members
The Romanov Family Association (RFA) is an organization of legitimate male-line descendants of Emperor Nicholas I of Russia. While extensive, it by no means includes all of the House of Romanov or all Romanov descendants; Maria Vladimirovna has never joined and neither did her late father, Vladimir Cyrillovich. The Association attributes the title of Prince or Princess of Russia to each of its members. Members of the Association now living are:

 Prince Dmitri Pavlovich Romanov-Ilynsky (b. 1954), grandson of Grand Duke Dmitri Pavlovich
 Princess Catherine Dmitrievna Romanov-Ilynsky (b. 1981), daughter of Prince Dmitri Pavlovich
 Princess Victoria Dmitrievna Romanov-Ilynsky (b. 1984), daughter of Prince Dmitri Pavlovich
 Princess Lela Dmitrievna Romanov-Ilynsky (b. 1986), daughter of Prince Dmitri Pavlovich
 Princess Paula Pavlovna Romanov-Ilynsky (b. 1956), granddaughter of Grand Duke Dmitri Pavlovich
 Princess Anna Pavlovna Romanov-Ilynsky (b. 1959), granddaughter of Grand Duke Dmitri Pavlovich
 Princess Natalia Nikolaevna (b. 1952), granddaughter of Prince Roman Petrovich
 Princess Elizabeth Nikolaevna (b. 1956), granddaughter of Prince Roman Petrovich
 Princess Tatiana Nikolaevna (b. 1961), granddaughter of Prince Roman Petrovich
 Prince Alexis Andreevich (b. 1953), grandson of Prince Andrei Alexandrovich
 Prince Peter Andreevich (b. 1961), grandson of Prince Andrei Alexandrovich
 Prince Andrew Andreevich (b. 1963), grandson of Prince Andrei Alexandrovich
 Princess Olga Andreevna (b. 1950), daughter of Prince Andrei Alexandrovich
 Prince Rostislav Rostislavich (b. 1985), grandson of Prince Rostislav Alexandrovich
 Prince Nikita Rostislavich (b. 1987), grandson of Prince Rostislav Alexandrovich
 Princess Stephena Rostislavna (b. 1963), granddaughter of Prince Rostislav Alexandrovich
 Princess Alexandra Rostislavna (b. 1983), granddaughter of Prince Rostislav Alexandrovich
 Princess Marina Vasilievna (b. 1940), daughter of Prince Vasili Alexandrovich

The RFA also offers Associate Memberships to the children and grandchildren of princesses and grand duchesses, widows and widowers of princes and princesses and grand dukes and grand duchesses, as well as people who have always shown close ties to the Romanovs. One of the Associate Members as of 1998 is still alive:

 Mrs Xenia Sfiris née Countess Sheremeteva (b. 1942), granddaughter of Princess Irina Alexandrovna

General Assembly
 President: Princess Olga Andreevna
 Vice president: Prince Rostislav Rostislavovich

Committee members
 Prince Alexis Andreevich 
 Prince Nikita Rostislavovich 
 Princess Natalia Nikolaevna 
 Princess Catherine Dmitrievna 
 Princess Alexandra Rostislavna

Presidents
Prince Dmitri Alexandrovich (1979–1980)
Prince Vasili Alexandrovich (1980–1989)
Prince Nicholas Romanovich (1989–2014)
Prince Dimitri Romanovich (2014–2016)
Princess Olga Andreevna (since December 2017)

References

External links
Official  Romanov Family Association website
Romanov Family Association statement on succession
The Romanov Fund for Russia

 
 
Family associations